Besh Qol is a village in Samangan Province, in northern Afghanistan. It is located approximately 50 kilometres west of Pol-e-Khomri.

See also
 Samangan Province

References

External links
Maplandia World Gazetteer

Populated places in Samangan Province